"Ace in the Hole" is a song written by Dennis Adkins, and recorded by American country music artist George Strait. George's touring band is called "The Ace in the Hole Band." It was released in July 1989 as the third single from his album Beyond the Blue Neon.  It became his 18th #1 single as well as his 11th in a row.

Content
This song visualizes life as a game where you have to keep a few tricks up your sleeve to get ahead. According to the lyrics, everyone needs to fight in order to succeed and have a good life, and in order to beat out the competition, you need some good people around you.

Chart performance
"Ace in the Hole" reached number 1 on the Billboard Hot Country Songs chart and on the Canadian RPM Country Tracks chart.

Year-end charts

References

1989 singles
George Strait songs
Song recordings produced by Jimmy Bowen
MCA Records singles
1989 songs